Arthur Meier (22 January 1925 – 10 February 2016) was a Liechtensteiner cross-country skier. He competed in the men's 50 kilometre event at the 1948 Winter Olympics.

References

1925 births
2016 deaths
Liechtenstein male cross-country skiers
Olympic cross-country skiers of Liechtenstein
Cross-country skiers at the 1948 Winter Olympics
Place of birth missing